Octodecanal is a long-chain aldehyde, with the chemical formula C18H36O (also known as stearyl aldehyde).  Octadecanal is used by several species of insect as a pheromone.

References 

Fatty aldehydes
Alkanals